The Wonnangatta Station was a cattle station located in a remote valley of the Victorian Alps, Australia. According to writer Harry Stephenson the station, while it operated, was "the most isolated homestead in Victoria."

Location

The Wonnangatta Station homestead was accidentally burnt down by bushwalkers in 1957. Some stockyards and the old cemetery, which has been restored to something resembling its original form, survive. Today the area is part of the Alpine National Park, and is only accessible by four-wheel drive vehicle, dirt bike, horse or foot. The station remains a popular off-road destination and has numerous facilities for campers, including septic toilets and concrete fire pits.

History
The station had been established in the 1860s by Oliver Smith, a North American who came across the valley while prospecting for gold. Smith’s common law wife Ellen or "Nancy" and her son Harry joined him and a homestead was built near the junction of the Wonnangatta River and Conglomerate Creek.

Some time later Ellen died in childbirth, and soon after Smith sold out to William Bryce before eventually returning to the United States.

The Bryce family then occupied the station while Ellen’s son Harry Smith moved down the valley and established himself at Eaglevale. The Bryce family remained a presence at Wonnangatta until Mrs Bryce died in 1914 at the age of 78. Ten Bryce children were brought up at Wonnangatta. As the children grew up they moved away and after Mrs Bryce’s death the property was sold to Mansfield owners in 1916, who installed a manager to run the station.

The Wonnangatta Murders 

The station and surrounding area are the site of the still-unsolved Wonnangatta murders which occurred in late 1917 and 1918.

See also
 List of ranches and stations

References

External links
 Wonnangatta Valley Facebook page. 
 Wonnangatta Valley Website
 Wonnangatta Station government website 
 Australian Alps National Park government website

Stations (Australian agriculture)
1860s establishments in Australia
Alpine National Park
Agriculture in Victoria (Australia)